Chroodiscus is a genus of leaf-dwelling lichens in the family Graphidaceae. It was first introduced by Swiss lichenologist Johannes Müller Argoviensis in 1883 as a section of the genus Ocellularia. In 1890 he promoted it to generic status.

Species
Chroodiscus africanus 
Chroodiscus anomalus 
Chroodiscus argillaceus 
Chroodiscus australiensis 
Chroodiscus australis 
Chroodiscus coccineus 
Chroodiscus defectus 
Chroodiscus graphideus 
Chroodiscus homchantarae 
Chroodiscus khaolungensis 
Chroodiscus khaosokensis 
Chroodiscus mirificus 
Chroodiscus neotropicus 
Chroodiscus parvisporus 
Chroodiscus subhimalayanus  – India
Chroodiscus submuralis 
Chroodiscus verrucosus

References

Graphidaceae
Taxa described in 1883
Ostropales genera
Taxa named by Johannes Müller Argoviensis